Craven Langstroth Betts (1853–1941) was a Canadian poet and author.

A seller of law books from Nova Scotia, the Maritimes- one of the first people from there to settle in New York- Betts was a friend and patron of the American poet Edwin Arlington Robinson; he served as his 'banker', cashing cheques that came from the dwindling Robinson estate at Maine, as well as lending him small sums money. The two men were frequent drinking and dining companions, and in the summers of 1900 and 1901, lived together at Betts's house in Manhattan whilst his mother and aunt were away in cooler climes. Their friendship lasted throughout Robinson's life; eventual success led him to more than repay Betts's financial support, presenting him with original manuscripts to sell, and leaving him $1,000 in his will.

Books by Betts 
 The Perfume-Holder 1891
 Tales of a Garrison Town New York ; D.D. Merrill, 1892 (with Eaton, Arthur Wentworth Hamilton)
 A Garland Of Sonnets 1899
 Selected Poems Of Craven Langstroth Betts 1916
 The Two Captains 1921
 The Perfume Holder and Other Poems J. T. White and company, 1922

He also translated Songs From Beranger by Pierre-Jean de Béranger, 1888.

Poems 
 Don Quixote
 To the Moonflower

External links 
 Tales of a Garrison Town

References

1853 births
1941 deaths
19th-century Canadian poets
Canadian male poets
20th-century Canadian poets
19th-century Canadian male writers
20th-century Canadian male writers